The 4th ACTRA Awards were presented on April 23, 1975. The ceremony was hosted by Pierre Berton.

Due to the cancellation of the Canadian Film Awards in 1974, ACTRA opted to present selected film awards for the first time, with a dedicated award for best film actor and the awards for dramatic and documentary writing opened to both television and theatrical film productions; however, with the Canadian Film Awards returning in 1975, this was not maintained in future years. 

The 1975 ceremony also marked the first time that ACTRA presented an award for Best Program rather than solely honouring individuals; a single award was presented inclusive of both television and radio programs this year, with separate categories for television and radio programming introduced at the 5th ACTRA Awards in 1976. Additionally, the 1975 awards marked the introduction of the Foster Hewitt Award for television sportscasting; this year it was presented as a lifetime achievement award, separately from the existing award for television sportscasting within the previous broadcast year, but they were merged into a single award in future years.

In 1978, The Globe and Mail revealed for the first time an unconfirmed but longstanding industry rumour that if Lloyd Robertson had won the award for Best News Broadcaster, elements in the audience were planning to pie him in the face just to see if they could cause the normally unflappable Robertson to lose his composure.

Winners and nominees

References

ACTRA
ACTRA
ACTRA Awards